In baseball, an assist (denoted by A) is a defensive statistic, baseball being one of the few sports in which the defensive team controls the ball. An assist is credited to every defensive player who fields or touches the ball (after it has been hit by the batter) before the recording of a putout, even if the contact was unintentional. For example, if a ball strikes a player's leg and bounces off him to another fielder, who tags the baserunner, the first player is credited with an assist. A fielder can receive a maximum of one assist per out recorded. An assist is also credited if a putout would have occurred, had another fielder not committed an error. For example, a shortstop might field a ground ball cleanly, but the first baseman might drop his throw. In this case, an error would be charged to the first baseman, and the shortstop would be credited with an assist. Unlike putouts, exactly one of which is awarded for every defensive out, an out can result in no assists being credited (as in strikeouts, fly outs and line drives), or in assists being credited to multiple players (as in relay throws and rundown plays). The right fielder (RF) is one of the three outfielders, the defensive positions in baseball farthest from the batter. The right field is the area of the outfield to the right of a person standing at home plate and facing toward the pitcher's mound. The outfielders must try to catch long fly balls before they hit the ground or to quickly catch or retrieve and return to the infield any other balls entering the outfield. The right fielder must also be adept at navigating the area of right field where the foul line approaches the corner of the playing field and the walls of the seating areas. Being the outfielder farthest from third base, the right fielder often has to make longer throws than the other outfielders to throw out runners advancing around the bases, so they often have the strongest or most accurate throwing arm. The right fielder normally plays behind the second baseman and first baseman, who play in or near the infield; unlike catchers and most infielders (excepting first basemen), who are virtually exclusively right-handed, right fielders can be either right- or left-handed. In the scoring system used to record defensive plays, the right fielder is assigned the number 9, the highest number.

Right fielders are most commonly credited with an assist when they throw the ball to an infielder who tags a runner attempting to advance on the basepaths, even on a caught fly ball that results in an out (see tag up); of special importance are throws to the catcher if the runner is trying to reach home plate to score a run, perhaps on a sacrifice fly. Right fielders will often record assists by throwing out runners who try to advance farther than the batter, such as going from first to third base on a single, or batter/runners who try to stretch a hit into a longer one. Right fielders also earn assists on relay throws to infielders after particularly deep fly balls, by throwing to a base to record an out on an appeal play, or in situations where they might deflect a fly ball before another defensive player makes the catch. Outfielders record far fewer assists than other players due to the difficulty of making an accurate throw in time to retire a runner from a great distance; middle infielders routinely record more assists in a single season than outfielders do in their entire careers. Assists are an important statistic for outfielders, giving a greater indication about an outfielder's throwing arm than assists by infielders do. In recent years, some sabermetricians have begun referring to assists by outfielders as baserunner kills.

The list of career leaders is dominated by players from the 1890s through 1920s, including the dead-ball era, due to that period's emphasis on more aggressive baserunning. Eight of the top nine players were active before 1930; only six of the top 19 players were active after 1950, none of them after 1992. Only 15 of the top 102 single-season totals were recorded after 1936, and only four after 1978; only 16 of the top 268 have been recorded since 1990. Because game accounts and box scores often did not distinguish between the outfield positions, there has been some difficulty in determining precise defensive statistics before 1901; because of this, and because of the similarity in their roles, defensive statistics for the three positions are frequently combined. Although efforts to distinguish between the three positions regarding games played during this period and reconstruct the separate totals have been largely successful, separate assist totals are unavailable; players whose totals are missing the figures for pre-1901 games are notated in the table below. Harry Hooper is the all-time leader in career assists as a right fielder with 333; he is the only right fielder with more than 300 career assists. Jason Heyward, who had 67 assists through the 2022 season to place him 115th all-time, is the leader among active players.

Key

List

Other Hall of Famers

References

External links

Major League Baseball statistics
Assists as a right outfielder